Gwendoline Tracey Philippa Christie (born 28 October 1978) is an English actress and model. She is known for portraying Brienne of Tarth in the HBO fantasy-drama series Game of Thrones (2012–2019), and the First Order stormtrooper Captain Phasma in the films Star Wars: The Force Awakens (2015) and Star Wars: The Last Jedi (2017). For the former, she received a nomination for the Primetime Emmy Award for Outstanding Supporting Actress in a Drama Series in 2019. Christie has since appeared in the Netflix fantasy series The Sandman and Wednesday (both 2022).

Early life
Gwendoline Tracey Philippa Christie was born in Worthing, West Sussex. She has two older half-brothers. Her mother was a housewife, and her father worked in sales and marketing. She grew up in a hamlet near the South Downs. As a child she trained as a gymnast but took up acting after a spinal injury. Around 2002, she worked in a boutique in Brighton.

She graduated from Drama Centre London in 2005. She was told she "would probably never work because [she] didn't look the same as most actors", due to her unconventionally tall physique, and was even told "well, good luck with that" by her agent after stating she would like to work on screen. She was inspired to continue pursuing this goal by Tilda Swinton's performance in Orlando. In a 2017 interview, she recalled thinking "Well, she is in a film, she is otherworldly, and is definitely outside the room. ... I realised that maybe there is a place for me too."

Career

Stage actress and early on-screen career (2006–2011) 
In 2002, Christie's height attracted the attention of photographer Polly Borland, who made Christie the subject of a noted series of photographs, entitled Bunny, between 2002 and 2008. According to Christie, she felt then that the photographs—in which she appears mostly nude—could help her come to terms with her body, and challenge notions of femininity. However, she later said that she was shocked in retrospect that she had agreed to them.

Christie's mentor since drama school has been actor and author Simon Callow. Her theatrical career includes a performance as the Queen in Shakespeare's Cymbeline opposite Tom Hiddleston, portraying Mag Wildwood in Breakfast at Tiffany's, and "standing out" as Lucifer in Marlowe's Doctor Faustus (2010).

On screen, Christie debuted with a 2007 short film titled The Time Surgeon, written and directed by Nathaniel Mellors. In the following years, she continued to appear in his works, such as Seven Ages of Britain Teaser, a short TV film acting as an introduction to the final episode of the documentary series Seven Ages of Britain, and the first four films of his Ourhouse series of experimental short films, released between 2010 and 2011 as parts of art exhibitions or in selected public screenings. She was also involved in Ourhouse behind the scenes, acting as associate producer and being credited for casting, costumes, props, and make-up. Meanwhile, she made her feature film debut with a minor role in the Terry Gilliam film The Imaginarium of Doctor Parnassus in 2009. In 2009 she joined Patrick Wolf in the music video for "Damaris".

Joining Game of Thrones and Wizards vs Aliens (2011–2015) 

In July 2011, Christie was cast as the warrior Brienne of Tarth in the second season of HBO's fantasy TV series Game of Thrones. Her character – an unusually tall, muscular, and plain-looking woman – is a favourite among many readers of the novels, and Christie had been proposed for the role by fans long before auditions took place. Christie said that she could draw on her own experiences of having been bullied for her height and androgynous looks to play the part of Brienne, a role that she was passionate to play after reading the A Song of Ice and Fire novels which the show adapts. To prepare even for the auditions, she started wearing unisex clothing to help her get into her character's more masculine mindset, and took up an intensive training regime, gaining over a stone (6.4 kg, 14 lb) of muscle mass. According to series co-writer, producer, and author of the novels, George R. R. Martin, she obtained the role practically without debate after an arresting audition at which she appeared already made up and costumed as Brienne. After being cast in the role, she prepared for it by working out extensively, taking horsemanship, sword-fighting, and stagefighting lessons.

Her debut was in the second season's third episode, "What Is Dead May Never Die", which aired on 15 April 2012. Her debut performance was well received by critics; Nina Shen Rastogi praised her "eloquent and economical physical performance", noting that her walk, stance, and mien effectively conveyed Brienne's single-minded devotion to her self-given quest to become a knight. For her performance as Brienne in the show's third season, Christie was nominated for the Saturn Award for Best Supporting Actress on Television in 2014. As a part of the cast, she was also nominated for a total of four Screen Actors Guild Awards for Outstanding Performance by an Ensemble in a Drama Series (she was not a part of the nominated cast in certain years depending on her number of appearances each season).

In addition to her role in Game of Thrones, Christie appeared in the British science fantasy series Wizards vs Aliens by Doctor Who writers Russell T Davies and Phil Ford from 2012 to 2013, in the main role of Lexi, the 17-year-old Princess of the Nekross, the alien species invading earth. For the role, she wore heavy make-up, although she also appeared with her usual physique as Lucy, the human form of Lexi. She also had a minor role in another Terry Gilliam movie, The Zero Theorem, released in 2013.

Star Wars and Top of the Lake (2015–present) 

In 2015, Christie played Commander Lyme in the fourth installment in The Hunger Games film series, The Hunger Games: Mockingjay – Part 2. Actress Lily Rabe had signed on for the part previously, but had to back out due to scheduling conflicts. The same year, she joined the cast of Swallows and Amazons as Mrs. Blackett, but later dropped out.

Also in 2015, Christie co-starred in Star Wars: The Force Awakens, as Captain Phasma, one of the film's supporting antagonists. Her performance, and the character's design, were both praised; however, the character received criticism for her minimal role in the film, particularly after she was prominently featured in promotional material.

In 2017, Christie had a main role in China Girl, the second season of Top of the Lake, as Miranda Hilmarson, a Constable in the Sydney Police Force, and the new partner of the show's main character played by Elisabeth Moss; the character was written especially for Christie by series co-creator Jane Campion, after Christie asked her to be a part of the series. The same year, she reprised her role of Captain Phasma in Star Wars: The Last Jedi, a sequel to The Force Awakens. She would later reprise the role for three episodes of the animated series Star Wars Resistance in 2018.

In 2018, she appeared as the bounty hunter Lady Jane in The Darkest Minds, an adaptation of the book trilogy The Darkest Minds by Alexandra Bracken, as Gwen in the Peter Strickland film In Fabric, and as the Russian caretaker Anna in the Robert Zemeckis film Welcome to Marwen.

Game of Thrones concluded in 2019 with its eighth season; for her performance in the final season, Christie received her first Primetime Emmy Award nomination for Outstanding Supporting Actress in a Drama Series; she also received a second Saturn Award for Best Supporting Actress on Television nomination for her performance in the final two seasons.

In January 2021, Christie was cast as Lucifer in the Netflix adaptation of The Sandman.

In November 2022, Christie played Principal Larissa Weems in the Netflix comedy horror series Wednesday.

Personal life
Her height led to her being bullied when she was younger.

She has been in a relationship with fashion designer Giles Deacon since early 2013.

Filmography

Feature films

Television

Theatre

Video games

Short films

She also appeared in the music video for Goldfrapp's "Strict Machine" in 2003 as well as the music video for "Damaris" by Patrick Wolf in 2009.

Audio dramas

References

External links

 
 
 

1978 births
Living people
Actresses from London
Actresses from Sussex
Alumni of the Drama Centre London
British film actresses
British stage actresses
British television actresses
People educated at Warden Park School
People from Worthing
21st-century British actresses
21st-century English people
21st-century English women